The Natano Ministry is the 15th ministry of the Government of Tuvalu, led by Prime Minister Kausea Natano.  It succeeded the Sopoaga Ministry upon its swearing in by the acting Governor-General, Mrs. Teniku Talesi Honolulu, on 18 September 2019.

Natano served as a Minister for Public Utilities and Industries in the Ielemia Ministry (2006-2010); and he was Deputy Prime Minister and Minister for Communications, Transport and Public Utilities in the Telavi Ministry (2010–2013).

Cabinet

Natano appointed the members of the Cabinet, which met for the first time on 20 September 2019.

References

2019 in Tuvalu
Politics of Tuvalu
Current governments
2019 establishments in Oceania
Cabinets established in 2019
2020s in Tuvalu
Ministries of Elizabeth II
Ministries of Charles III